Santa Monica Magazine was the premier magazine for the greater Santa Monica metropolitan area. Santa Monica Magazine along with the Santa Monica Sun  are the only two Santa Monica magazines. Santa Monica Magazine was the second largest publication in the city after the Santa Monica Mirror.

SENSE Media Group
The parent company, the SENSE Media Group was founded in 1997. It published Santa Monica Magazine, Sense magazine, and the Los Angeles Sports Journal.

References

External links
Santa Monica Magazine's Official Site
SENSE Media Groups Official Site

Lifestyle magazines published in the United States
Local interest magazines published in the United States
Monthly magazines published in the United States
Defunct magazines published in the United States
Magazines established in 2008
Magazines disestablished in 2009
Magazines published in California